Sari Multala (born 5 July 1978 in Helsinki) is a Finnish Olympic sailor, politician and a member of Parliament of Finland.

Background
Multala started sailing at the age 8 in a 24 ft keelboat however she soon switched to racing the Optimist (dinghy) class and soon started on the youth program of the Marjaniemen Purjehtijat Sailing Club. She went on to compete in the 2000 Olympic Sailing Competition and 2004 Olympic Sailing Competition finishing fifth in the Women's Singlehanded Class the Europe (dinghy).  At the 2012 Summer Olympics, she competed in the women's laser radial dinghy class where she finished 7th.

She is also a two time world champion in the laser radial class, and has also won a silver and bronze in the same event.

She was shortlisted in 2002 by the International Sailing Federation for the ISAF World Sailor of the Year Awards.

Politics 
Multala was elected to Vantaa City Council in 2012 representing National Coalition Party. She was elected to the Parliament of Finland for the first time in the 2015 parliamentary elections and was re-elected in 2019.

Since 2017 she has served as Chair of City Board in Vantaa.

Significant results
 5th 2000 Olympic Sailing Competition
 1st 2001 Europe Class World Championship, Vilamoura, POR
 5th 2004 Olympic Sailing Competition
 2nd 2007 Laser Radial Women World Championship, Cascais, POR
 1st 2009 Laser Radial Women World Championship, Karatsu, JPN
 1st 2010 Laser Radial Women World Championship, Largs, GBR
 7th 2012 Olympic Sailing Competition
 3rd 2012 Laser Radial Women World Championship, Boltenhagen, GER

References

External links
 
 
 
 

1978 births
Living people
Politicians from Helsinki
National Coalition Party politicians
Members of the Parliament of Finland (2015–19)
Members of the Parliament of Finland (2019–23)
21st-century Finnish women politicians
Finnish female sailors (sport)
Olympic sailors of Finland
Sailors at the 2000 Summer Olympics – Europe
Sailors at the 2004 Summer Olympics – Europe
Sailors at the 2012 Summer Olympics – Laser Radial
Europe class world champions
World champions in sailing for Finland